The Petroleum (Consolidation) Act 1928 (18 & 19 Geo. 5 c. 32) is a UK Act of Parliament to consolidate the enactments relating to petroleum and petroleum-spirit. It specified and updated the conditions for the granting of licenses for keeping petroleum spirit; the labelling of containers for petroleum spirit; its transport; and regulations for certain uses.

Background 
The Petroleum Act 1871 was still the principal Act controlling the licensing, storage and use of petroleum and petroleum products in the late 1920s. It was recognised that considerable changes had taken place since 1871 in the use of petroleum such as the development of the motor car and the increased use of petrol by the public. It had also become difficult for local authorities to administer the law as it was distributed over a number of Acts, and partly because the Act of 1871 was seen as not being well drafted and difficulties had arisen over interpretation.

Before the Petroleum (Consolidation) Act 1928 could be enacted the existing legislation needed to be amended, this was enacted by the Petroleum (Amendment) Act 1928.

Petroleum (Amendment) Act 1928 
The Petroleum (Amendment) Act 1928 (18 & 19 Geo. 5 c. 20) comprised four sections. The first dealt with harbours and the definition of a "harbour authority" which had previously been ambiguous. Section 2 dealt with the making of bylaws for substances other than petroleum, such as calcium carbide. Section 3 dealt with the repeal of section 5 of the Locomotives on Highways Act 1896. That section was a concession applied to motor cars, which had then been considered to be light locomotives. Petrol had since been used for agricultural machinery, motorboats, stationary engines for electric lighting, and for pumping water. The Act of 1871 required a licence from the local authority, which was not necessary for these new applications. Section 4 gave canal companies a general power of making by-laws for the transport of petrol. The Petroleum (Amendment) Act 1928 cleared up several pieces of poor legislative draftsmanship, with this and other legislation then incorporated into the consolidated act.

Petroleum (Consolidation) Act 1928 
The Petroleum (Consolidation) Act 1928 (18 & 19 Geo. 5 c. 32) received royal assent on 3 August 1928. Its long title is ‘An Act to consolidate the enactments relating to petroleum and to petroleum-spirit’.

Provisions 
The Act comprises 26 Sections under nine headings plus three schedules

 Licences for Keeping Petroleum-Spirit
 Section 1 Petroleum-spirit not to be kept without a licence
 Section 2 Provisions as to licences
 Section 3 Appeals from refusals by local authorities to grant licences
 Section 4 Fees payable for licences
 Labelling of Vessels containing Petroleum-Spirit
 Section 5 Provisions as to the labelling of vessels containing petroleum-spirit
 Transport of Petroleum-Spirit
 Section 6 Regulations as to the conveyance of petroleum-spirit by road
 Section 7 Byelaws as to ships loading and carrying petroleum-spirit in harbour
 Section 8 Notice of ships carrying petroleum-spirit to be given on entering harbour 
 Section 9 Byelaws as to loading, conveyance and landing of petroleum-spirit in and upon canals
 Special Provisions as to Keeping, Use and Supply of Petroleum-Spirit for Motor Vehicles
 Section 10 Regulations as to the keeping and use of petroleum-spirit for purpose of motor vehicles, motor boats, aircraft and engines
 Section 11 Byelaws as to petroleum filling stations
 Regulations as to special Classes of Petroleum-Spirit
 Section 12 Regulations as to classes of petroleum-spirit likely to be dangerous or injurious to health
 Accidents in connection with Petroleum-Spirit
 Section 13 Notice to be given of accidents connected with petroleum-spirit
 Section 14 Inquiry into accidents connected with petroleum-spirit
 Section 15 Coroners' inquests on deaths from accidents connected with petroleum-spirit
 Powers of Inspection, &c
 Section 16  Powers of government inspectors
 Section 17 Powers of officers of local authorities as to testing petroleum-spirit
 Section 18 Warrants to search for and seize petroleum-spirit
 Power to apply Act to other Substances
 Section 19 Power to make Orders in Council applying Act to other substances
 Supplementary
 Section 20 Provisions as to apparatus for and method of testing petroleum
 Section 21 Regulations and byelaws to be laid before Parliament
 Section 22 Confirmation and publication of byelaws
 Section 23 Interpretation
 Section 24 Application to Scotland
 Section 25 Savings
 Section 26 Short title, extent, repeal and commencement
 Schedules
 First Schedule – Rates of Fees payable in respect of Licences to keep Petroleum-Spirit
 Second Schedule – Apparatus to be used and Manner of testing Petroleum therewith so as to ascertain the Temperature at which it will give off Inflammable Vapour
 Third Schedule – Enactments repealed

Related and subsequent legislation 
The Petroleum (Consolidation) Act 1928 repealed the following statutes:

 The Petroleum Act 1871 (34 & 35 Vict. c. 105)
 The Petroleum Act 1879 (42 & 43 Vict. c. 47)
 The Petroleum Act 1926 (16 & 17 Geo. 5 c. 25)
 The Petroleum (Amendment) Act 1928 (18 & 19 Geo. 5 c. 20)

Section 2 of the Petroleum (Transfer of Licences) Act 1936 (26 Geo. 5 & 1 Edw. 8 c. 27) construed the 1936 Act to be one with the 1928 Act and they could be cited together as the Petroleum (Regulation) Acts 1928 and 1936.

The Petroleum (Regulations) Acts 1928 and 1936 were still in force until 2014. They were repealed on 1 October 2014 by The Petroleum (Consolidation) Regulations 2014 (S.I. 2014/1637).

See also 

 History of fire safety legislation in the United Kingdom 
 Petroleum Acts

References 

United Kingdom Acts of Parliament 1928
Petroleum industry in the United Kingdom
History of the petroleum industry in the United Kingdom